The Volkswagen Logus was a rebadged Ford Escort MkV launched by Volkswagen in a two-door coupé configuration in March 1993, as part of the Ford Motor Company and Volkswagen do Brasil joint venture in South America called AutoLatina. The Logus was designed in the Ghia Studios in Italy under the stewardship of Luiz Alberto Veiga from Volkswagen do Brasil.

The Logus was launched in March 1993 with four versions: CL 1.6, CL 1.8, GL 1.8 and GLS 1.8. All engines versions were available to use ethanol or gasoline (so in fact there were eight versions). It was assembled in São Bernardo do Campo, Brazil, alongside its rebadged cousin, the Ford Escort MkV.

A facelift was planned, as well as potential cabriolet and pickup variants, but was cancelled with the dissolution of AutoLatina.

Highlights
 The Logus had an aerodynamic rating of Cd 0.33.
 1.8-litre engines had an electronic carburetor.
 In 1994, the GLS engine was upgraded to a 2.0-litre engine.
 In 1996, the Wolfsburg Edition was released.
 The final production year was 1997, as the AutoLatina partnership had been dissolved.

See also
Volkswagen Pointer

References

External links
 Logus & Pointer Club (in Portuguese)
 Best Car Website Brazil reviews Logus & Pointer (in Portuguese)

Logus
Cars of Brazil